The St. Louis Cardinals, a professional baseball franchise based in St. Louis, Missouri, compete in the National League (NL) of Major League Baseball (MLB).  Founded in 1882 as a charter member of the American Association (AA), the team was originally named the Brown Stockings before it was shortened to Browns the next season.  The team moved to the National League in 1892 when the AA folded.  The club changed its name to the Perfectos for one season in 1899 and adopted the Cardinals name in 1900. The St. Louis Cardinals are tied with the Cincinnati Reds and Pittsburgh Pirates as the third-oldest continuously-operated baseball team.  In that time, the team has won 19 National League pennants and 11 World Series championships (most in the National League and second only to the New York Yankees, who have won 27).  They also won four American Association pennants and one pre-World Series championship that Major League Baseball does not consider official.

The Cardinals had six periods of continued success during their history.  The first period occurred during the 1880s when the team won four consecutive American Association pennants from 1885–1888 while known as the Browns.  The Cardinals next found success from 1926–1934 when they played in five World Series, winning three.  During World War II the Cardinals won four NL pennants in five years from 1942–1946, including three World Series championships.  During the 1960s the Cardinals won two World Series and played in another.  In the 1980s the Cardinals played in three World Series, winning in 1982.  Most recently, the Cardinals have made the playoffs nine times, winning seven NL Central titles and qualifying as a wild-card entrant in 2001, 2011 and 2012, winning the World Series in 2006 and 2011.

The only extended period of failure the Cardinals have experienced began when they joined the National League in 1892.  The Cardinals played only five winning seasons in 30 years while finishing last seven times from their entrance to the NL until 1921.  However, the Cardinals have remarkably avoided such failure since then as they have not finished in last place in the National League since 1918, by far the longest streak in the NL. Like the Yankees and Dodgers, the Cardinals have never lost 100 games in a season since World War I. The Cardinals failed to reach the World Series in the 1950s, 1970s, and 1990s, but were regularly a competitive team in each of these decades.

Year by year

All-time records

Record by decade 
The following table describes the Cardinals' regular season MLB win–loss record by decade.

These statistics are from Baseball-Reference.com's St. Louis Cardinals History & Encyclopedia, and are current through the 2021 season.

Footnotes
The current variations of the Cardinals, Reds, and Pirates all began playing in 1882.  The two older clubs are the Atlanta Braves, who were founded in 1871 in Boston, and the Chicago Cubs, who have played continuously since 1874.
The Cardinals did finish in last place of the NL East in 1990. However, the Atlanta Braves of the NL West had a worse record. The next longest streak is by the Cincinnati Reds, who most recently finished in last place of the NL in 1982. The similar streak in the American League is held by the Boston Red Sox, who last finished in last place of the AL in 1932.
For lists of all National League pennant winners see National League pennant winners 1876–1900, National League pennant winners 1901-68, and National League Championship Series.
The Finish, Wins, and Losses columns list regular season results and exclude any postseason play. Regular and postseason records are combined only at the bottom of the list.
The GB column lists "Games Back" from the team that finished in first place that season. It is determined by finding the difference in wins plus the difference in losses divided by two.
The dispute in 1885 concerned Game 2, which was forfeited by St. Louis when they pulled their team off the field protesting an umpiring decision. The managers, Cap Anson and Charles Comiskey, initially agreed to disregard the game. When St. Louis won the final game and an apparent 3–2 Series championship, Chicago White Stockings owner Albert Spalding overruled his manager and declared that he wanted the forfeit counted. The result of a tied Series was that neither team got the prize money that had been posted by the owners before the Series (and was returned to them after they both agreed it was a tie).
The Cardinals moved from their original home, Sportsman's Park, to a new field called New Sportsman's Park where they played until 1920.  The ballpark would later be named League Park and then Robision Field under different Cardinals ownership.
During the season the Cardinals moved from Robison Field, where they had played since 1893, to become tenants of the St. Louis Browns at Sportsman's Park.  The Cardinals had originally played at Sportsman's Park from 1882–1892.
The 1944 World Series was nicknamed the "Streetcar Series" and featured the NL Cardinals against the AL St. Louis Browns.  Every game during the series was played at Sportsman's Park in St. Louis.
The Cardinals finished the 1946 regular season tied for first place in the National League with the Brooklyn Dodgers. However, the Cardinals claimed the pennant by winning the first two games in a best-of-three playoff series.
The 1946 World Series is best remembered for Enos Slaughter's Mad Dash to score the go-ahead run in the 8th inning of Game 7.

In 1953 the Cardinals were bought by Anheuser-Busch and Gussie Busch became team president, which he would remain until his death in 1989.  Busch then purchased Sportsman's Park from the rival St. Louis Browns and renamed it Busch Stadium.  The Browns would leave St. Louis after the season for Baltimore, Maryland.
In 1962 the National League increased the schedule from 154 games, which had been established since 1904, to 162 games, where it remains today.
During the season the Cardinals moved from Busch Stadium I, where they had played since 1920 to Busch Memorial Stadium.
In 1969 MLB expanded by 4 teams to 12 in each league and split each league into an East and West division, the Cardinals were placed in the National League East.
The 1972 Major League Baseball strike forced the cancellation of the first seven games (thirteen game-days) of the season.
The 1981 season was shortened by a player's strike.  MLB decided to split the season into two halves with the division winner of each half playing in a Divisional Round of the playoffs.  The Cardinals finished with the best overall record in the NL East at 59–43, but they finished in second place in both halves of the season and did not make the playoffs.
The 1985 World Series, nicknamed the "Show-Me Series" or "I-70 Series" because it featured two Missouri teams in St. Louis and the Kansas City Royals, is most remembered for The Call in Game 6.  With the Cardinals leading the series 3–2 and Game 6 1–0, they took the field in the 9th inning to claim the championship.  Pitcher Todd Worrell faced the Royals Jorge Orta first, Orta hit a slow ground ball to first baseman Jack Clark, who flipped the ball to Worrell at first for the apparent out. However, umpire Don Denkinger called Orta safe and the Cardinals unraveled to lose Game 6 and got blown out in Game 7.
The 1994–95 Major League Baseball strike  ended the season on August 11 and caused the entire postseason to be cancelled.
In 1994 MLB split each league into 3 divisions.  The Cardinals were placed in the newly created National League Central.
In 2001 the Cardinals and the Houston Astros tied for first place in the NL Central.  Since both teams were assured of a place in the playoffs, MLB declared it a shared championship.  Houston was granted the NL Central's position in the playoff bracket by way of a better head-to-head record and St. Louis was given the Wild Card spot.
The Cardinals began play in the new Busch Stadium in 2006 after 40 years at Busch Memorial Stadium.  They became the first team since the 1923 New York Yankees to win the World Series in their first season in a ballpark.
Major League Baseball considers this to be the Cardinals' official all-time record.  MLB does not count the years played in the American Association or post-season games towards the official record.

Related lists
 List of St. Louis Cardinals managers
 List of St. Louis Cardinals coaches

References
General

Specific

External links
 St. Louis Cardinals History

 
Major League Baseball teams seasons
St. Louis Cardinals lists